Arantxa Sánchez Vicario was the defending champion but lost in the quarterfinals to Elena Likhovtseva.

Steffi Graf won in the final 4–6, 6–2, 7–5 against Karina Habšudová.

Seeds
A champion seed is indicated in bold text while text in italics indicates the round in which that seed was eliminated. The top eight seeds received a bye to the second round.

  Steffi Graf (champion)
  Arantxa Sánchez Vicario (quarterfinals)
  Iva Majoli (semifinals)
  Anke Huber (quarterfinals)
  Mary Pierce (third round)
  Amanda Coetzer (second round)
  Barbara Paulus (quarterfinals)
  Natasha Zvereva (second round)
  Martina Hingis (second round)
  Nathalie Tauziat (quarterfinals)
  Ai Sugiyama (first round)
  Judith Wiesner (third round)
  Naoko Sawamatsu (third round)
  Yayuk Basuki (third round)
  Sabine Hack (third round)
  Sandrine Testud (second round)

Draw

Finals

Top half

Section 1

Section 2

Bottom half

Section 3

Section 4

References
 1996 WTA German Open Draw

WTA German Open
1996 WTA Tour